Central Coast Crusaders is a NBL1 East club based in Central Coast, New South Wales. The club fields a team in both the Men's and Women's NBL1 East. The Crusaders play their home games at Breakers Indoor Sports Stadium, formerly known as Gosford City Basketball & Sports Stadium. Alongside the stadium's junior program the Gosford City Rebels, they make up two of the premier Country association programs in New South Wales.

Club history
Prior to 2006, a club known as Central Coast Power hosted both a men's and women's team in the Waratah League. For the 2006 season, the Power departed and in came a new men's team known as the Central Coast Crusaders.

For the 2016 season, the Crusaders acquired the head coaching services of former Sydney Kings player and coach, Ian Robilliard.

In 2018, a women's Crusaders team entered the Waratah League for the first time.

In 2019, the Crusaders men's team won their first Waratah League championship, defeating the Manly Warringah Sea Eagles 74–72 in the grand final.

The Waratah League was rebranded as NBL1 East for the 2022 season.

References

External links
Official website of Breakers Indoor Sports Stadium

Waratah League teams
Basketball teams in New South Wales
Sport on the Central Coast (New South Wales)
Basketball teams established in 2006
2006 establishments in Australia